Sophie Earley is a Northern Irish table tennis player and as of November 2021, she ranked twelfth in the world Under-15 division. She participated at the 2022 Commonwealth Games in the Women's singles and Mixed doubles. In singles, Earley reached the round of 16 before being knocked out and in the Mixed doubles she reached the round of 32 alongside Owen Cathcart before being knocked out.

Biography
Sophie Earley is from Carryduff, Northern Ireland and was born on 13 May 2006. Earley studies at Malone College, Belfast. She studies A-level biology and psychology online and lives in Nottingham, England.

In October 2018, Earley became the first 12-year-old to win an adult ranking event in Ireland. She was part of the Ormeau Table Tennis Club before joining the a club in Nîmes, France. BBC Sport called Earley "one of the brighest table tennis prospects in the British Isles". Earley won bronze at the 2021 European Youth Championships in the Under 15s division in both singles and doubles (with Silvia Coll of Spain). This made her the first Irish player to achieve a medal at the tournament. She won the silver medal the ITTF Youth contender competition. Earley received £2,000 in funding from Bluewater Financial Planning bursary associated with the Mary Peters Trust. As of November 2021, she ranked twelfth in the world Under-15 division.

Earley participated at the 2022 Commonwealth Games in the Women's singles and Mixed doubles. In singles, in the preliminary stage she beat both Priscilla Greaves of Guyana and Christy Bristol of Seychelles 4–0. In the round of 32, she beat Zhou Jingyi of Singapore 4—3 before losing to Canada's Zhang Mo 3–4 in the round of 16. In the Mixed doubles, she played alongside Owen Cathcart and first won against Seychelles's Godfrey Sultan and Bristol 3–0 in the round of 64. In the round of 32, they lost to 0—3 India's Sharath Kamal and Sreeja Akula who ended up winning gold.

References

2006 births
Living people
Female table tennis players from Northern Ireland
Table tennis players at the 2022 Commonwealth Games
Sportspeople from Belfast